Allan Johansen (born 14 July 1971) is a Danish former professional road bicycle racer.

Career
In 2008 he joined . Johansen retired in 2009 ending his career with the 2009 Danmark Rundt when he was awarded the fighters award for the race. He rode in the 2000 Tour de France, and finished 119th overall. He also finished 125th in the 2005 Vuelta a España.

Major results

1997
 8th Grand Prix Herning
1998
 4th Overall Tour de Normandie
 7th Grand Prix Herning
1999
 1st BKI Grand Prix
 1st Rund um Düren
 1st Stage 1 Sachsen Tour
 1st Stage 1 Hessen Rundfahrt
2001
 9th GP de Denain
2002
 1st Paris–Bourges
 1st Stage 5 Rheinland-Pfalz Rundfahrt
 2nd Schaal Sels
 2nd GP Aarhus
 4th Grote Prijs Jef Scherens
 5th Overall Tour de Picardie
 8th GP de Denain
2003
 2nd Road race, National Road Championships
 10th GP Aarhus
2004
 1st GP Jef Scherens
 1st Hel van Het Mergelland
 3rd Paris–Brussels
 3rd GP Aarhus
 5th Overall Circuit Franco-Belge
 7th Veenendaal–Veenendaal
2005
 1st Stage 4 Sachsen Tour
 7th Wachovia Invitational
2006
 National Road Championships
1st  Road race
3rd Time trial
 1st GP Herning
 3rd Overall Tour de Luxembourg
1st Stage 1
2007
 4th Grand Prix Herning
 5th E3 Harelbeke
2008
 1st GP Copenhagen
 5th Dwars door Vlaanderen
 8th Omloop Het Volk
 8th Rogaland Grand Prix
 10th Tour of Flanders
2009
 1st Stage 4 Rhône-Alpes Isère Tour
 3rd Grand Prix Herning
 4th GP Bikebuster
 4th Overall Boucle de l'Artois
 6th Overall Danmark Rundt
 8th Overall Ronde de l'Oise
1st Stage 4

External links 
 
 Team CSC profile
 
 

Danish male cyclists
1971 births
Living people
People from Silkeborg
Sportspeople from the Central Denmark Region